Krokialaukis  is a small town in Alytus County in southern Lithuania. In 2011 it had a population of 218.

References

This article was initially translated from the Lithuanian Wikipedia.

Alytus District Municipality
Towns in Lithuania
Towns in Alytus County